Roger N Morris (born 1960 in Manchester) is an English writer and advertising copywriter. His first novel, Taking Comfort, was published by Macmillan New Writing and appeared in April 2006.

His second novel A Gentle Axe, based on the character Porfiry Petrovich from Dostoevsky's Crime and Punishment, was published by Faber and Faber.

References

External links
 Official site

1960 births
British copywriters
English writers
Living people